Bangari may refer to:
 Bangari (2013 film), an Indian Kannada-language romantic film
 Bangari (1963 film), an Indian Kannada film
 Bangari, Uttar Pradesh, a village in Jhansi district of Uttar Pradesh State, India
 Bangari railway station, a halt railway station on the Muzaffarpur–Gorakhpur main line